Hilko Ristau (born 24 April 1974) is a German former professional footballer. He made his debut on the professional league level in the 2. Bundesliga for SG Wattenscheid 09 on 29 August 1997 coming on as a substitute in the 31st minute in the game against SpVgg Unterhaching.

References

Living people
1974 births
Sportspeople from Bremerhaven
Footballers from Bremen (state)
Association football defenders
German footballers
OSC Bremerhaven players
Bonner SC players
SG Wattenscheid 09 players
VfL Bochum players
1. FC Saarbrücken players
Rot-Weiss Essen players
Bundesliga players
2. Bundesliga players